Altar is a Dutch death metal band. The band started in the early 1990s under various names, including Manticore and Anubis, in the town of Hardenberg. Eventually they settled on Altar. In 1992 they released their only demo, which landed them at Displeased Records. After five full-lengths the band split up in 2001. From time to time, the classic line-up reunites to play a limited number of shows under the name Altar-native.

Discography
 ...And God Created Satan to Blame for His Mistakes (Demo, 1992)
 Youth Against Christ (CD, 1994)
 Ego Art (CD, 1996)
 Provoke (album) (CD, 1998)
 In the Name of the Father (album) (CD, 1999)
 Until Heaven Forbids (EP, 2000)
 Red Harvest (CD, 2001)
 Altar (Demo, 2007)

Band members

Current line-up
Marcel van Haaff - guitar
Edwin Kelder - vocals
Nils Vos - bass
Marco Arends - drums

Former members
 Marcel Verdurmen  - guitar
 Richard Ludwig - guitar
 Michel Coppens - vocals
 Andre Hemel - bass
 Frank Schilperoort - drums
 Sjoerd Visch - drums
 Bert Huisjes - guitar
 Marco de Groot - drums

Dutch death metal musical groups
Musical groups disestablished in 2001
Musical quintets
2001 disestablishments in the Netherlands
Musical groups established in 1988
Hardenberg